Fast Japanese Spin Cycle is an EP by Guided by Voices, released in 1994.

This release finished tied for 3rd for the EP category in Robert Christgau's Pazz and Jop poll of 1994 .

Track listing
All songs written by Robert Pollard unless otherwise noted.

Side A
 "3rd World Birdwatching" (Pete Jamison, Jim Pollard, R. Pollard) – 0:42
 "My Impression Now" – 2:07
 "Volcano Divers" – 1:19
 "Snowman" (Kevin Fennell, R. Pollard) – 0:47

Side B
 "Indian Fables" (R. Pollard, Tobin Sprout) – 0:42
 "Marchers in Orange" [Different Version] (J. Pollard, R. Pollard) – 1:19
 "Dusted" [Different Version] – 2:06
 "Kisses to the Crying Cooks" – 1:20

References

1994 EPs
Guided by Voices EPs